Thomas Lamer (died 1397/98), of Dorchester (Dorset) and London was an English politician.

Career
He married a woman named Christine and they had one son and one daughter.

Career
He was a Member (MP) of the Parliament of England for Dorchester in February 1383, April 1384, November 1384, February 1388 and 1391.

References

Year of birth missing
1398 deaths
English MPs February 1383
Members of the Parliament of England for Dorchester
English MPs April 1384
English MPs November 1384
English MPs February 1388
English MPs 1391